Baga Beach is 2013 Indian Konkani-language film written and directed by Laxmikant Shetgaonkar. It followed his critically acclaimed Paltadacho Munis (2009).

Set in the eponymous Baga Beach in Goa, it was made at a budget of  crore, making it the most expensive film yet of Konkani cinema. The film deals with the underbelly of tourism in Goa, with issues of paedophilia and child sexual abuse, conflict between locals and immigrants leading to hostility towards migrant laborers, impact of holidaying foreigners on local culture.  The film had an Indian, German and French cast, including Bengali actress Paoli Dam, who spoke Hindi in the film.  It was shot in Goa with an handheld camera in sync sound.

It was screened at the 44th International Film Festival of India in 2013. Subsequently, it won the Best Feature Film in Konkani award at the 61st National Film Awards. After the awards, the Goa Legislative Assembly passed a resolution congratulating producer and director for making the film about "a topic which needed much attention", and called it an "eye opener on the issues related to children on our beaches." The film was commercially released in Goa on May 30, 2014, but was not commercially released nationwide.

Cast
 Paoli Dam as  Sobha
 Cedric Cirotteau as Martin
 Sadiya Siddiqui as Maggie
 Jean Denis Römer as  Schroeder
 Akash Sinha as Devappa
 Harsh Mainra as  Shop keeper
 Prashanti Talpankar as Celestine
 Reshma Jadhav as News Reporter
 Rajesh Karekar as Jerroviar
 Ivon C. de Souza as  Brendan
 Pradeep Naik as Victor
 Serjee Kleem as  Yuri

Awards
 National Award for Best Feature Film in Konkani at the 61st National Film Awards

See also
 Konkani cinema
 Paltadacho Munis

References

External links
 

2013 films
Films set in Goa
Films shot in Goa
Films about child sexual abuse
Tourism in Goa
Indian crime films
Films about pedophilia
2010s Konkani-language films
2013 crime films